Brazil national cerebral palsy football team is the national cerebral football team for Brazil that represents the team in international competitions.  The team has been active internationally, and was ranked third in the world in 2016.  At the 2015 IFCPF World Championships, they came away with a bronze.  This was an improvement on 2011 when they finished fourth.  Their best ever finish was second at the 2003 World Championships.  Appearing at multiple Paralympic Games, Brazil won silver in 2004 and bronze in 2008.

Background 

Associação Nacional de Desporto para Deficientes oversees the national team in Brazil. During the 2000s, the team was one of the top four most dominant teams in the world alongside Russia, Ukraine and Iran. In 2012, the team was coached by Paulo Cruz. In February 2014, a coaching workshop was held in the country to try to further develop the sport.  Brazilian and Argentine coaches participated in it.

National team development is supported by an International Federation of Cerebral Palsy Football (IFCPF) recognized national championship.  Recognized years for the national IFCPF recognized competition include  2010, 2011, 2012, 2013, 2014, and 2015.

In 2016, after getting an endorsement by the World AntiDoping Agency (WADA), the IFCPF Anti-Doping Code was formally amended to allow for out of competition testing.  This was done through a WADA approved Whereabouts Programme managed through ADAMS. Drawing from players in a  Registered Testing Pool, players from this country were included ahead of the 2016 Summer Paralympics in Rio.

Ranking 

In 2016, Brazil was ranked third in the world by the IFCPF. The team is also ranked first in the Americas. In November 2014 and August 2013, they were ranked third. In September 2012 and  September 2011, Brazil was ranked fourth.

Players 
There have been a number of players for the Brazilian squad.

Results 

Brazil has participated in a number of international tournaments. Six teams participated in the Toronto hosted American Cup in 2014. Group A included Venezuela, Argentina and Canada.  Group B included Mexico, Brazil and the United States.  The tournament was important for preparations for the 2015 Parapan American Games, and because it was the last major continental level competition of the year. Brazil came in second at the 2016 Pre-Paralympic Tournament in Salou, Spain after losing to Ukraine 0 - 2 in the final.

IFCPF World Championships 
Brazil has participated in the IFCPF World Championships.

Paralympic Games 

Brazil has participated in 7-a-side football at the Paralympic Games.

Paralympic Results

References 

Cerebral Palsy
Brazil at the Paralympics
National cerebral palsy football teams
Football 7-a-side
Football 7-a-side teams at the 2016 Summer Paralympics
Football 7-a-side teams at the 2012 Summer Paralympics
Football 7-a-side teams at the 2008 Summer Paralympics
Football 7-a-side teams at the 2004 Summer Paralympics
Football 7-a-side teams at the 2000 Summer Paralympics
Football 7-a-side teams at the 1996 Summer Paralympics
Football 7-a-side teams at the 1992 Summer Paralympics